Sir Nathaniel Rahumaea Waena GCMG, CSI, KStJ (born 1 November 1944) was the Governor-General of Solomon Islands from 2004 to 2009.

Waena was a Member of the National Parliament for Ulawa-Ugi constituency in the Makira-Ulawa Province from 1984 to 2004. He served as Deputy Speaker of Parliament before becoming Assistant Prime Minister and Minister of Provincial Government in 2000, and afterwards he became Minister for National Unity, Peace and Reconciliation.

He was elected as Governor-General by the National Parliament on June 15, 2004. He received 27 of 41 votes, compared to 6 for incumbent Sir John Lapli and 8 for former Prime Minister Sir Peter Kenilorea.

Sir Nathaniel was knighted soon after assuming office and later awarded the Cross of Solomon Islands (CSI).

On June 15, 2009, Frank Kabui was elected to succeed Waena as Governor-General. In the fourth round of voting, in which Kabui was elected with 30 votes, Waena received seven votes, placing third.

References

Living people
Members of the National Parliament of the Solomon Islands
Knights Grand Cross of the Order of St Michael and St George
Recipients of the Cross of Solomon Islands
Governors-General of Solomon Islands
People from Makira-Ulawa Province
Government ministers of the Solomon Islands
1944 births